Group A of the 2013 Africa Cup of Nations ran from 19 January until 27 January. It consisted of South Africa (hosts), Angola, Morocco and Cape Verde. The matches were held in the South African cities of Johannesburg, Durban and Port Elizabeth.

Standings

All times South African Standard Time (UTC+2)

Matches

South Africa vs Cape Verde

Angola vs Morocco

South Africa vs Angola

Morocco vs Cape Verde

Morocco vs South Africa

Cape Verde vs Angola

References

External links

2013 Africa Cup of Nations